Giampaolo Cheula (born 23 May 1979 in Premosello-Chiovenda) is an Italian former professional racing cyclist. After retiring from road cycling in 2011, Cheula raced as a mountain biker for a year.

Major results

2000
 1st  Overall Flèche du Sud
1st Stage 2
 3rd Trofeo Alcide Degasperi
2002
 1st  Overall Circuit de Lorraine
1st Stage 1
 1st Stage 3 Bayern Rundfahrt
 10th Tour du Lac Léman
2004
 3rd Giro d'Oro
 6th Trofeo Matteotti
 7th Overall Bayern Rundfahrt
1st  Mountains classification
2005
 2nd Tour de Berne
 3rd Overall Vuelta a Asturias
2006
 1st  Overall Peace Race
 4th GP Llodio
 4th GP Industria & Artigianato di Larciano
 6th Trofeo Laigueglia
2007
 5th Subida al Naranco
2008
 1st GP Nobili Rubinetterie
 9th Ronde van Drenthe
2009
 8th Tre Valli Varesine
2010
 3rd Gran Premio di Lugano
 4th Overall Tour of Turkey
 8th Overall Vuelta a la Comunidad de Madrid
2011
 6th Overall Tour of Elk Grove

Grand Tour general classification results timeline

References

External links 
Profile at Barloworld official website

1979 births
Living people
Italian male cyclists
Sportspeople from the Province of Verbano-Cusio-Ossola
Cyclists from Piedmont